The enzyme kievitone hydratase catalyzes the chemical reaction

kievitone hydrate  kievitone + H2O

This enzyme belongs to the family of lyases, specifically the hydro-lyases, which cleave carbon-oxygen bonds.  The systematic name of this enzyme class is kievitone-hydrate hydro-lyase (kievitone-forming). Other names in common use include KHase, and kievitone-hydrate hydro-lyase.

References

 

EC 4.2.1
Enzymes of unknown structure